Big Bald Mountain may refer to:

 Big Bald Mountain, New Brunswick, Canada
 Big Bald Mountain, Georgia, United States
 Big Bald, Tennessee and North Carolina, United States